Carebara armata is a species of ant from the subfamily Myrmicinae. The scientific name of this species was first published in 1948 by Horace Donisthorpe.

References

External links

Myrmicinae
Insects described in 1948